Gökan Lekesiz (born 25 January 1991) is a German footballer who most recently played as a forward for FSV Duisburg.

Career
He was promoted to the first team of MSV Duisburg in 2014.

In 2015, he was signed by Fortuna Sittard.

References

External links
 
 

1991 births
Living people
German people of Turkish descent
People from Viersen
Sportspeople from Düsseldorf (region)
German footballers
Footballers from North Rhine-Westphalia
Association football forwards
3. Liga players
Regionalliga players
TFF Second League players
Eredivisie players
MSV Duisburg players
Rot-Weiß Oberhausen players
SC Wiedenbrück 2000 players
SV 19 Straelen players
Fortuna Sittard players
German expatriate footballers
German expatriate sportspeople in the Netherlands
Expatriate footballers in the Netherlands